Şeref Osmanoğlu (born Sheryf El-Sheryf; 2 January 1989 in Simferopol, Ukrainian SSR, Soviet Union) is a Turkish and former Ukrainian (until May 2013) athlete who competes in the triple jump and occasionally long jump.

Career
He won gold medal at the 2011 European Athletics U23 Championships with a leap of 17.72m, bettering his personal best by 80 cm. In 2012, he won the silver medal in the triple jump at the European Athletics Championships.

He has a Ukrainian mother while his father, a doctor, is from Sudan. He changed his allegiance to Turkey in 2013, also changing his name to Şeref Osmanoğlu. The Turkish federation paid $152,000 to the Ukrainian federation for the transfer.

Competition record

References

External links
 

1989 births
Living people
Sportspeople from Simferopol
Ukrainian male triple jumpers
Ukrainian male long jumpers
Turkish male triple jumpers
Turkish male long jumpers
Ukrainian people of Sudanese descent
Athletes (track and field) at the 2012 Summer Olympics
Athletes (track and field) at the 2016 Summer Olympics
Olympic athletes of Ukraine
Olympic athletes of Turkey
European Athletics Championships medalists
Ukrainian emigrants to Turkey
Naturalized citizens of Turkey
Olympic male triple jumpers